VLG.FILM is a Ukrainian independent film distribution company. The headquarters is located in Los Angeles, California. According to the results of 2020, the company's share in the Ukrainian film distribution market was 15.17%. VLG.FILM is the local distributor of films by Miramax, StudioCanal, STX Entertainment, A24, Lionsgate, Focus Features International, EuropaCorp, Pathé Exchange, Kinology, Affinity Equity Partners, Exclusive Media Group, TF1 and others.

History 

VLG.FILM was founded on March 10, 2010 under the name Volga Ukraine, the official name change took place on October 4, 2021.

According to the results of the first quarter of film distribution in 2021 in Ukraine, the share of VLG.FILM among distributors in the total number of releases is 9.6%. The share of the total box office is 7.4%.

Projects 

VLG.FILM released more than 222 films in Ukrainian box office, which were watched by more than 12 million viewers in cinemas, and the total box office rent exceeded ₴850 million. These films include the Hunger Games, After, and The Adventures of Paddington franchises, Guy Ritchie's The Gentlemen and Wrath of Man, the science fiction film Valerian and the City of a Thousand Planets, and the animated films The Queen's Corgi and The Ballerina and others.

The company releases both mainstream films, including The Commuter, Vice, Death of Stalin, and original films from world directors — Pedro Almodóvar and Woody Allen, Paul Thomas Anderson and Ari Aster, Gaspar Noé and Luca Guadagnino, Matteo Garrone and Darren Aronofsky.

Among the Ukrainian releases of VLG.FILM is films Chuzha Molitva by Akhtem Seitablayev, Viddana by Khrystyna Syvolap, Swingers-2 by Andreys Ekis, Dating in Vegas by Serhiy Wayne, Let It Show by Stanislav Kapralov, Burshtynovi Kopy and others.

Owner 

The company is a 100% subsidiary of the film distribution company VLG.FILM INC., the ultimate beneficiary of which is Sergey Ershov.

References

External links 

Film organizations in Ukraine